Yarrie may refer to:

 Yarrie Station; a pastoral lease now functioning as a cattle station, in Pilbara, Western Australia, Australia
 Yarrie mine; an iron ore mine, operated by BHP Billington, in Pilbara, Western Australia, Australia
 Yarrie homestead, on Yarrie Road, on the De Grey River, in northwest Western Australia, Australia, see List of homesteads in Western Australia: X–Z
 Yarrie, Goldfields-Esperance, Western Australia, Australia; the region around the town of Yarri, Western Australia
 Yarri (Wiradjuri) also spelled "Yarrie", aka Coonong Denamundinna (1810-1880), an aboriginal Australian man and local hero

See also
 Yarri (disambiguation)
 Yari (disambiguation)